John "Bobby" Ogolla (born in Kenya) is a former Kenyan international defender and football manager.

He previously served as assistant coach to Kenyan Premier League sides [[Sofapaka F.C.

Playing Career
John Bobby Ogolla played for Kisumu Hot Stars before moving to Gor Mahia in 1979 as the understudy to James Kadir Ogolla. Kadir was on his way out and in 1980 he left Bobby to partner Mike "machine" Ogolla in Gor Mahia defense. 

In Kisumu he was known as 'simba' but at Gor he became "six million dollar man" a nickname he got from a popular TV series of the time. 

He soon got a call up to the national team and partnered Josephat Murila of AFC Leopards'in defense. They helped Kenya win the regional CECAFA tournament three times in a row from 1981 to 1983.

In the 1983 edition played in Kenya, Kenya conceded only one goal in their first match against Uganda which Kenya won 2-1. They beat Zimbabwe 2-0 to win their third consecutive title. 

John Bobby partnered with Austin Oduor in the Gor defense until he retired in 1989. 

]] and Gor Mahia F.C., and head coach at World Hope F.C., Nairobi City Stars, Muhoroni Youth F.C. and most recently Kenya Police FC.

Twice he was an assistant coach to Kenya head coach Reinhard Fabisch, and was on one occasion the head coach.

As a player, he turned out for Kisumu Hot Stars before joining Gor Mahia F.C.

References

External links
 John Bobby Ogola at gormahia.net
 
 John "Bobby" Ogolla - International Appearances at rsssf.org

1959 births
Living people
Kenyan footballers
Kenya international footballers
Gor Mahia F.C. players
Kenyan Premier League players
Kenyan football managers